The 1957–58 Drexel Dragons men's basketball team represented Drexel Institute of Technology during the 1957–58 men's basketball season. The Dragons, led by 6th year head coach Samuel Cozen, played their home games at Sayre High School and were members of the College–Southern division of the Middle Atlantic Conferences (MAC).

Roster

Schedule

|-
!colspan=9 style="background:#F8B800; color:#002663;"| Regular season
|-

References

Drexel Dragons men's basketball seasons
Drexel
1957 in sports in Pennsylvania
1958 in sports in Pennsylvania